Amor prohibido (English: Forbidden Love) is a Mexican telenovela produced by Ernesto Alonso for Televisa in 1979.

Is an adaptation of telenovela Senda prohibida produced in 1958.

Cast 
Claudia Islas as Magda
José Alonso as Juan Manuel
Liliana Abud as Silvia
Ignacio López Tarso as Arturo Galvan
Saby Kamalich as Clara Galvan
Emilia Carranza
María Rojo
Miguel Ángel Ferriz
Nubia Martí
María Sorté
Sergio Goyri
Enrique Barrera-Alejandro

References

External links 

Mexican telenovelas
1979 telenovelas
Televisa telenovelas
Spanish-language telenovelas
1979 Mexican television series debuts
1979 Mexican television series endings